The Akahoya eruption was the strongest known volcanic eruption of the Kikai Caldera in Kyūshū, Japan.

Retrospective dating
Archaeologically it has been dated around 7,300 cal. BP during the earliest stage of the Jōmon period, but it had also been uncorrected radiocarbon dated to as recent as 6,500 BP. The current accepted dating adjustment from multiple other sources is about 7,200 to 7,300 years ago.

Aftermath
This eruption has been linked to the end of the initial Jōmon culture in southern Kyūshū although impact, although marked, was not as great as some commentary had suggested with Nishinozono sub-type pottery tradition, that had started prior maintained throughout and after the eruption sequence in Kyūshū. It took nearly 1000 years to recover.  Jōmon who lived further away survived such as on northern Kyūshū, Honshū and Hokkaidō but likely had to revert for a period to maritime food sources mainly.

The fate of the initial Jōmon culture on south Kyūshū does not quite parallel the demise of the Minoan civilization, which may have ended as a consequence of another massive volcanic eruption.

However these events give more credence to cultural traditions that maintain stories of established cultures vanishing quickly and completely, since it is known to have happened in (Holocene) human history, in two very different parts of the world. The events also call for deeper study into the effects of volcanic activity on human cultural development.

References

Volcanoes of Kyushu
Volcanic eruptions in Japan
Prehistoric volcanic events
VEI-7 eruptions
Plinian eruptions
Jōmon period